Ozhivu Divasathe Kali (English title: An Off-Day Game) is a 2015 Indian Malayalam indie drama film directed by Sanal Kumar Sasidharan, based on the short story of the same name by Unni R. The film follows five middle-aged men who get together for a booze party during an election holiday in Kerala. It won the 46th Kerala State Film Award for Best Film. The film was included in The Hindu's top 25 Malayalam films of the decade and is widely regarded as one of the defining movies of the Malayalam New Wave.

The film was initially showcased at the festival circuits in October 2015, including the International Film Festival of Kerala and the Mumbai Film Festival. The film has only 70 shots, with the second half of the film being just a single shot. Under Aashiq Abu's initiative, the film got a limited theatrical release in Kerala on 17 June 2016.

Synopsis
On an election holiday, five friends get together for a booze party. Their only intention is fun and refreshment. As the time passes they start to open up the hidden wildness of their real nature.
Tired and bored in arguments they plan to play a game. A game they used to play in their childhood.

Cast
Nisthar Sait as Dharman 
Baiju Netto as Dasan 
Girish Nair as Thirumeni
Pradeep Kumar as Vinayan
Reju R Pillai as Narayanan
Abhija Sivakala as Geetha
Arun Nair as Ashokan 
Sridhar P.U. as Ganeshan

Development and production
The film is based on the story of well known short story writer Unni R. The story has been successfully adopted to make political satire. There was no script while shooting the film. The film has some unique features because of this making pattern. All the dialogues are evolved due to improvisations and it contains some fine long takes. One of the lengthy shots conceived in the film is 53 minutes.

Reception

Critical response
Charu Nivedita called this film, 'a miracle in Indian cinema'. Deborah Young of The Hollywood Reporter gave a positive review, saying that "The classic buddy movie is cleverly revisited with a critical eye on Indian politics and society... Sasidharan builds suspense all the way to the sickening climax." Gautaman Bhaskaran of the Hindustan Times gave a positive review. He called the film "a griping tale of corruption" and concluded by saying "An Off-Day Game, finally, is a brutal look at the way the Constitution is used for the benefit of some, at the way caste politics and colour prejudices have been wrecking our lives." After the 17the of June theatrical release, G. Ragesh of Manorama Online gave a favorable review with a 3 stars out of 5. Ragesh concluded with "Ozhivu Divasathe Kali must be watched as a political movie, but without any prejudice. It's a deliberate take on hypocrisies in the society, an entertaining trial in which you would find yourself either in the spot of the victim or the culprit."

Awards and accolades
 FIPRESCI Award for the Best Malayalam film in the International Film Festival of Kerala (IFFK)
Kerala State Film Award for Best Film - 2015
Kerala State Film Award for Best Sound Recordist - 2015
 Official Selection in International Film Festival of Kerala IFFK2015
 Official Selection in Mumbai Academy of the Moving Image MAMI2015
 Selection in Film Bazaar Recommends, Goa

References

External links
 
 Official trailer

2015 films
2010s Malayalam-language films
Films directed by Sanal Kumar Sasidharan